Patrick or Pat Ward may refer to:

Patrick Ward (actor) (1950–2019), Australian actor
Patrick Ward (photographer) (born 1937), British photographer
Pat Ward (footballer) (1926–2003), Scottish footballer